Ahmetcan Kaplan (born 16 January 2003) is a Turkish professional footballer who plays as a centre-back for Eredivisie club Ajax. He has represented Turkey internationally at youth levels U16, U17, U19, and U21.

Club career
A youth product of Trabzonspor, Kaplan signed his first professional contract with the club on 10 August 2020. He made his professional debut for Trabzonspor in a 1–1 Süper Lig tie with Alanyaspor on 27 September 2021.

Kaplan joined Dutch club Ajax of the Eredivisie on a five-year contract in August 2022.

International career
Kaplan is a youth international for Turkey, having represented the Turkey U16s and U17s.

Honours
Trabzonspor
 Süper Lig: 2021–22
 Turkish Super Cup: 2022

References

External links
 Profile at the AFC Ajax website
 
 
 

2003 births
Living people
Sportspeople from Trabzon
Turkish footballers
Association football central defenders
Turkey under-21 international footballers
Turkey youth international footballers
Süper Lig players
Trabzonspor footballers
AFC Ajax players
Turkish expatriate footballers
Turkish expatriate sportspeople in the Netherlands
Expatriate footballers in the Netherlands